Joseph Jerome Gapido Porciuncula (born June 4, 1995), better known as Jerome Ponce, is a Filipino actor and model. He rose to fame after being cast in the hit Philippine daytime series Be Careful With My Heart as Luke Andrew Lim.

Career
Ponce portrayed a minor role in the musical play Cory ng Edsa and started his showbiz career as a stage actor in theatre plays. In 2012, Ponce made his television debut in the long-running Philippine romantic comedy television series, Be Careful With My Heart, as Luke Lim, the eldest son of Richard "Sir Chief" Lim. Before joining the daytime drama, Ponce auditioned twice to enter Pinoy Big Brother and he was put in the reserved slot, but failed to make it to enter the house. He is one of the 12 "discoveries" for the new actors and actresses of the 2013 Star Magic Circle. Ponce had starring roles in the drama series Nasaan Ka Nang Kailangan Kita, The Good Son, and A Soldier's Heart.

Personal life
Ponce was born on June 4, 1995. He graduated in Malayan High School of Science in Pandacan, Manila. He postponed his college studies at the Mapua Institute of Technology after entering his acting career.

Filmography

Online series

Movies

Television

Awards

References

External links

1995 births
ABS-CBN personalities
Filipino male models
Filipino male television actors
Living people
Mapúa University alumni
Male actors from Manila
People from Santa Mesa
Star Magic